Blackjack David is the sixth album by the American artist Dave Alvin, released in 1998.

Reception

Writing for AllMusic, Janna Pendragon stated: "A Renaissance man, Dave Alvin continues to make and record music of integrity." Music critic Robert Christgau wrote: "...making the personal historical is still his metier—the border patrolman of 'California Snow', the Vietnam casualty of '1968'. He also knows how to make rootlessness historical. But I say he just likes the road."

Track listing
All songs by Dave Alvin unless otherwise noted.
"Blackjack David" (Traditional) – 5:02
"Abilene" – 4:57
"New Highway" – 3:14
"California Snow" (Dave Alvin, Tom Russell) – 4:00
"Evening Blues" – 5:33
"The Way You Say Goodbye" – 4:37
"Mary Brown" – 4:30
"Laurel Lynn" – 3:36
"1968" (Alvin, Chris Gaffney) – 4:03
"From a Kitchen Table" – 5:56
"Tall Trees" (Alvin, Fontaine Brown) – 4:47

Personnel
Dave Alvin – vocals, guitar
Chris Gaffney – accordion
Dan McGough – organ
Gregory Boaz – bass
Bob Glaub – bass
David Piltch – bass
Bobby Lloyd Hicks – drums, percussion, background vocals
Greg Leisz – guitar, lap steel guitar, mandolin, banjo, dobro, mandola, pedal steel guitar, slide guitar
Brantley Kearns – fiddle
Dillon O'Brian – accordion, harmonium, piano
Doug Wieselman – clarinet, organ

Production notes
Paul DuGre – engineer, mixing
David Ahlert – engineer
Joe Gastwirt – mastering
Lou Beach – design
Kate Hoddinott – package design
Issa Sharp – photography
Dave Hoekstra – liner notes

References

1998 albums
Dave Alvin albums
HighTone Records albums